Leopold (c. 1108 – 18 October 1141), known as Leopold the Generous, was margrave of Austria (appearing in lists as Leopold IV) from 1136, and duke of Bavaria from 1139 until his death in 1141.

Biography
He was one of the younger sons of Margrave Leopold III, the Holy. It is not known why he was originally preferred to his brothers Adalbert and Henry Jasomirgott.

Through his mother Agnes, he was related to the Hohenstaufen. In the course of their struggle against the competing Welfen family, he was given the formerly Welfish Bavaria as a fief by Emperor Conrad III. He managed to maintain his position there, as his brother Otto was Bishop of Freising there.

The most important measure of his short reign was the Exchange of Mautern entered into with the Bishop of Passau in 1137. The bishop was given the St. Peter's Church in Vienna, while the Margrave received extended stretches of land from the bishop outside the city walls, with the notable exception of the territory where a new church was to be built, which was to become St. Stephen's Cathedral.

Leopold died unexpectedly at Niederaltaich Abbey in Bavaria and was succeeded by his brother Henry.

See also
List of rulers of Austria

References
Citations

Bibliography

External links

 Leopold IV., Babenberger-Markgraf at AEIOU

1100s births
1141 deaths
12th-century margraves of Austria
12th-century dukes of Bavaria
Leopold 4
Burials at Heiligenkreuz Abbey